NCW Libraries is an inter-county rural library district in northern Washington state. It was founded as the North Central Regional Library (NCRL) in 1960 and is headquartered in Wenatchee, Washington. The system has 30 branches.

NCW Libraries provides service to its many rural patrons through a mail order catalog—one of the first and last remaining to be deployed in the United States. Materials are sent three times per year via rural postal routes and returned through an included mail label.

The American Civil Liberties Union filed a lawsuit against the NCRL in 2006 over its online content filter, which was upheld in federal court. In 2019, the NCRL announced that it would be renamed to NCW Libraries as part of a rebranding strategy.

Programs

The NCW Libraries Bilingual Outreach Program provides regularly scheduled Spanish/English storytimes at public schools, and other facilities serving children throughout Grant County. In 2003, NCRL received a federal "Serving Cultural Diversity" grant that funded bilingual library materials, a van, and audio listening centers.

In 2004, NCRL directed its first author in residence program to middle-school age children by bringing author Ben Mikaelsen to six middle schools and the Wenatchee Public Library for programs. The program has since expanded with other authors serving libraries and schools throughout the district.

Branches

Brewster Community Library
Bridgeport Community Library
Cashmere Community Library
Chelan Community Library
Coulee City Community Library
Curlew Public Library
East Wenatchee Community Library
Entiat Community Library
Ephrata Community Library
Grand Coulee Community Library
Leavenworth Community Library
Manson Community Library
Mattawa Community Library
Moses Lake Community Library
Okanogan Community Library
Omak Community Library
Oroville Community Library
Pateros Community Library
Peshastin Community Library
Quincy Community Library
Republic Community Library
Royal City Community Library
Soap Lake Community Library
Tonasket Community Library
Twisp Community Library
Warden Community Library
Waterville Community Library
Wenatchee Public Library
Winthrop Community Library

References

External links

County library systems in Washington (state)
Education in Chelan County, Washington
Education in Douglas County, Washington
Education in Ferry County, Washington
Education in Grant County, Washington
Education in Okanogan County, Washington